Daniel Bernhardsson (born 31 January 1978 in Årsunda) is a Swedish footballer who plays for Gefle IF in Allsvenskan as a defender. He has played over 300 matches for Gefle IF and he serves as team captain.

External links
 

1978 births
Gefle IF players
Allsvenskan players
Swedish footballers
Living people
Association football defenders